V-Tech Rampage is a controversial amateur action video game that recreates the 2007 Virginia Tech shooting on the campus of Virginia Tech in Blacksburg, Virginia, United States. The game was created by 21-year-old Ryan Lambourn from Australia. The Flash-based game came to light when it was uploaded to Newgrounds using Lambourn's screen name Master PiGPEN.

The previous prominent virtual school shooting reenactment, Super Columbine Massacre RPG!, is a role-playing video game and has received praise for artistic merit as well as condemnation. V-Tech Rampage was created to be offensive
without redeeming value.

In 2013, Lambourn caused further controversy with his game The Slaying of Sandy Hook Elementary, which re-created the Sandy Hook Elementary School shooting. Unlike V-Tech Rampage, however, The Slaying of Sandy Hook Elementary was created to support gun control laws.

Gameplay
The game is a one-person work released 3 weeks after the Virginia Tech massacre. Its graphics and control are both intentionally and amusingly clumsy. The player controls Seung-Hui Cho, the killer, through "3 levels of stealth and murder!" in a slanted overhead view. In the first level, the player must walk across Virginia Tech campus to shoot Emily J. Hilscher, Cho's real life first victim, without killing too many other people or scaring Emily away. Emily's death is witnessed by Ryan Clark, Cho's second victim, who also must be killed. In the second, he must walk across the same campus while avoiding the searchlights of police investigators. This is the only section with appreciable challenge. In the third, he barricades the exit of a school building and must shoot everyone inside in 90 seconds before the police arrive to arrest him. During this level, a song created by Lambourn plays while audio clips praise or laugh at murder, or scold the player for merely wounding. Liviu Librescu is the only real victim to appear in this segment. The game finishes with Cho's suicide, which occurs when the player presses the shoot button.

Cho monologues about mission goals and can also speak to other characters, whose reactions differ depending on whether they're fleeing Cho or not. The game's dialogue has occasional grammar or spelling errors, and is riddled with obscenities, insults, racist terms, scatological references and offers of sex from female characters in exchange for their lives.

Events
Lambourn offered to remove the game if he received $2,000 in "donations." For an additional $1,000, he offered to apologize.

Attention angry people: I will take this game down from newgrounds (the games website) if the donation amount reaches $1000 US. I'll take it down from here [his website] if it reaches $2000 US, and I will apologise if it reaches $3000 US.

Lambourn later retracted the offer to remove the game, stating:

...the donation thing is there as a joke against all the people commanding me to take my game down. I didn't think anyone would donate money to it and so far my paypal account has proven me right...

In 2013, a "RIAA edition" was created, with the original tracks removed, due to copyright infringement with the RIAA. This has replaced the original version on Newgrounds, The original edition was until recently available on Lambourn's site, however it has since been removed due to further threats from the RIAA. Now the RIAA edition is the only available one on his site, with the title music "Hey, Hey, Hey, ---- The RIAA" on a looped track. However the unedited version can still be found. The MP3 of the music in question can also be acquired.

Impact
The game was compared to Super Columbine Massacre RPG!, due to the re-creation of a mass murder in which the player controls the killer through a video game. Danny Ledonne, creator of Super Columbine Massacre RPG! posted a comment on Lambourn's website:

Inevitably, comparisons between [Super Columbine Massacre RPG!] and [V-Tech Rampage] are being made right now... For myself I wish to point out that [Super Columbine Massacre RPG!] was never a for-profit endeavor and thus I never posted statements like that which is on the [V-Tech Rampage] game's homepage (...) I would like to ask bloggers to consider not whether a game about the Virginia Tech shooting SHOULD be made but how we might go about making a game that accomplishes more than [V-Tech Rampage] does with the subject matter.

New York State Senator Andrew Lanza, chair of the Senate Task Force on Youth Violence and the Entertainment Industry requested that the gaming community boycott the game. However, video game publications wrote of concerns about backlashes against video games and wrote that this game was created by an individual, not the gaming industry.

GamesRadar.com ranked the game as 4th in the Top 7 Most Evil Games.

See also

Super Columbine Massacre RPG!

References

External links
Game at googumproduce.com
Game at newgrounds.com

2007 controversies
2007 video games
Flash games
Single-player video games
Obscenity controversies in video games
Video games developed in Australia
Video games set in 2007
Video games set in Virginia
Violence in video games
Virginia Tech shooting